Garhbeta III is a community development block that forms an administrative division in Medinipur Sadar subdivision of Paschim Medinipur district in the Indian state of West Bengal.

Geography

In Garhbeta III CD block 95% of the cultivated area has alluvial soil and 5% has lateritic soil. Garhbeta III CD block is drought prone.

Garhbeta III CD block is bounded by Garhbeta I CD block in the north, Chandrakona II CD blocks in the east, Keshpur and Salboni CD blocks in the south and Garhbeta II CD block in the west.

It is located 48 km from Midnapore, the district headquarters.

Garhbeta III CD block has an area of 312.12 km2. It has 1 panchayat samity, 8 gram panchayats, 115 gram sansads (village councils), 232 mouzas and 188 inhabited villages. Garhbeta and Goaltore police stations serve this block. Headquarters of this CD block is at Satbankura.

Garhbeta III CD block had a forest cover of 6,242 hectares, against a total geographical area of 30,308 hectares in 2005-06.

Gram panchayats of Garhbeta III block/ panchayat samiti are: Amsole, Karsa, Nalbana, Nayabasat, Raskundu, Sankarkata, Satbankura and Uriasai.

Demographics

Population
According to the 2011 Census of India Garhbeta III CD block had a total population of 169,528, of which 148,809 were rural and 20,719 were urban. There were 86,023 (51%) males and 83,505 (49%) females. Population in the age range 0–6 years was 21,215. Scheduled Castes numbered 26,004 (15.34%) and Scheduled Tribes numbered 23,955 (14.13%).

As per the 2001 census, Garhbeta III block had a total population of 145,827, out of which 74,846 were males and 70,981 were females. Garhbeta III block registered a population growth of 23.93 per cent during the 1991-2001 decade. Decadal growth for the combined Midnapore district was 14.87 per cent. Decadal growth in West Bengal was 17.45 per cent.

Census Towns in Garhbeta III CD block are (2011 census figures in brackets): Durllabhganj (6,796), Dwarigeria (7,754) and Naba Kola (6,169).

Large villages (with 4,000+ population) in Garhbeta III CD block are (2011 census figures in brackets): Chhota Tara (4,872), Methia Dahar (4,831) and Bila (4,085).

Other villages in Garhbeta III CD block include (2011 census figures inbrackets): Satbankura (3,118), Naya Basat (3,286), Karsa (1,737), Raskunda (3,238), Uriyashai (1,345), Amsol (1,309) and Nalbona (1,642).

Literacy
According to the 2011 census the total number of literate persons in Garhbeta III CD block was 108,885 (72.21% of the population over 6 years) out of which males numbered 60,243 (79.89% of the male population over 6 years) and females numbered 48,642 (66.72% of the female population over 6 years).The gender gap in literacy rates was 13.18%.
 
See also – List of West Bengal districts ranked by literacy rate

Language and religion
According to the District Census Handbook, Paschim Medinipur, 2011 census, as of 2001, Bengali was the mother-tongue of 90.5% of the population of Paschim Medinipur district, followed by Santali (4.6%), Hindi (1.4%), Kurmali Thar (0.7%), Urdu (0.6%), Telugu (0.6%), Odia (0.4%), Mundari (0.2%), Koda/ Kora (0.1%), Munda (0.1%) and Nepali (0.1%). There were people, forming lesser proportion of population, having other languages as mother-tongue. People with other mother-tongues formed 0.7% of the population.

There is a tribal presence in many of the CD blocks of the district. Santali is spoken by 55.93% of the tribal population of the district. The Bhumij, forming 11.16% of the tribal population, speak Bhumij and the Mundas, forming 6.10% of the tribal population, speak Mundari. Other small groups include Koras and Mahalis. The Lodhas, forming 3.85% of the tribal population, the only primitive tribe in the district, speak Lodhi.

According to the West Bengal Official Language Act 1961 and the West Bengal Official Language (Amendment Act) 2012, the Bengali language is to be used for official purposes in the whole of West Bengal. In addition to Bengali, the Nepali language is to be used for official purposes in the three hills subdivisions, namely Darjeeling, Kalimpong and Kurseong, in the district of Darjeeling, and Urdu is to be used for official purposes in district/subdivision/ block/ municipality where the population speaking Urdu exceeds 10% of the total population. The English language will continue to be used for official purposes as it was being used prior to the enactment of these laws.

The West Bengal Official Language (Second Amendment) Bill, 2012, included Hindi, Santhali, Odiya and Punjabi as official languages if it is spoken by a population exceeding 10 per cent of the whole in a particular block or sub-division or a district. Subsequently, Kamtapuri, Rajbanshi and Kurmali were also included in the list of minority languages by the West Bengal Official Language (Second Amendment) Bill, 2018. However, as of 2020, there is no official / other reliable information about the areas covered. Census 2011 provides language data only at the district and above level.

In the 2011 census Hindus numbered 114,602 and formed 67.60% of the population in Garhbeta III CD block. Muslims numbered 46,330 and formed 27.33% of the population. Others numbered 8,596 and formed 5.07% of the population. Others include Addi Bassi, Marang Boro, Santal, Saranath, Sari Dharma, Sarna, Alchchi, Bidin, Sant, Saevdharm, Seran, Saran, Sarin, Kheria, Christians and other religious communities.

BPL families
In Garhbeta III CD block 31.95% families were living below poverty line in 2007.

According to the District Human Development Report of Paschim Medinipur: The 29 CD blocks of the district were classified into four categories based on the poverty ratio. Nayagram, Binpur II and Jamboni CD blocks have very high poverty levels (above 60%). Kharagpur I, Kharagpur II, Sankrail, Garhbeta II, Pingla and Mohanpur CD blocks have high levels of poverty (50-60%), Jhargram, Midnapore Sadar, Dantan I, Gopiballavpur II, Binpur I, Dantan II, Keshiari, Chandrakona I, Gopiballavpur I, Chandrakona II, Narayangarh, Keshpur, Ghatal, Sabang, Garhbeta I, Salboni, Debra and Garhbeta III CD blocks have moderate levels of poverty (25-50%) and Daspur II and Daspur I CD blocks have low levels of poverty (below 25%).

Economy

Infrastructure
192 or 83% of mouzas in Garhbeta III CD block were electrified by 31 March 2014.

194 mouzas in Garhbeta III CD block had drinking water facilities in 2013-14. There were 121 fertiliser depots, 135 seed stores and 35 fair price shops in the CD block.

Agriculture

Although the Bargadari Act of 1950 recognised the rights of bargadars to a higher share of crops from the land that they tilled, it was not implemented. Large tracts, beyond the prescribed limit of land ceiling, remained with the rich landlords. From 1977 onwards major land reforms took place in West Bengal. Land in excess of land ceiling was acquired and distributed amongst the peasants. Following land reforms land ownership pattern has undergone transformation. In 2013-14, persons engaged in agriculture in Garhbeta III CD block could be classified as follows: bargadars 4.90%, patta (document) holders 25.76%, small farmers (possessing land between 1 and 2 hectares) 3.65%, marginal farmers (possessing land up to 1 hectare) 25.22% and agricultural labourers 40.48%.

In 2005-06 the nett cropped area in Garhbeta III CD block was 14,500 hectares and the area in which more than one crop was grown was 12,411 hectares.

The extension of irrigation has played a role in growth of the predominantly agricultural economy. In 2013-14, the total area irrigated in Garhbeta III CD block was 6,585 hectares, out of which 100 hectares were irrigated by canal water, 350 hectares by tank water, 2,325 hectares by deep tubewells, 2,600 hectares by shallow tube wells, 350 hectares by river lift irrigation, 25 hectares by open dug wells and 260 hectares by other methods.

In 2013-14, Garhbeta III CD block produced 10,930 tonnes of Aman paddy, the main winter crop, from 6,163 hectares, 1,745 tonnes of Boro paddy (spring crop) from 731 hectares, 356 tonnes of wheat from 218 hectares and 36,288 tonnes of potatoes from 3,500 hectares. It also produced oilseeds.

Banking
In 2013-14, Garhbeta III CD block had offices of 11 commercial banks and 1 gramin bank.

Transport
Garhbeta III CD block has 29 originating/ terminating bus routes.

The Kharagpur-Bankura-Adra line of South Eastern Railway passes through this CD block. There is a station named as Chandrakona Road located at Daradabcha mouza.

State Highway 4 running from Jhalda (in Purulia district) to Digha (in Purba Medinipur district) passes through this block.

Education
In 2013-14, Garhbeta III CD block had 122 primary schools with 10,623 students, 15 middle schools with 2,320 students, 10 high school with 8,405 students and 8 higher secondary schools with 10,110 students. Garhbeta III CD block had 1 general college with 710 students and 311 institutions for special and non-formal education with 13,590 students.

The United Nations Development Programme considers the combined primary and secondary enrolment ratio as the simple indicator of educational achievement of the children in the school going age. The infrastructure available is important. In Garhbeta III CD block out of the total 122 primary schools in 2008-2009, 21 had pucca buildings, 49 partially pucca, and 52 multiple type.

Gourav Guin Memorial College was established at Chandrakona Road, PO Satbankura in 2008.

Healthcare
In 2014, Garhbeta III CD block had 1 hospital, 1 rural hospital, 2 primary health centres and 1 private nursing home with total 390 beds and 9 doctors. It had 24 family welfare sub-centres and 1 family welfare centre. 5,405 patients were treated indoor and 105,620 patients were treated outdoor in the hospitals, health centres and subcentres of the CD block.

Dwarigeria Rural Hospital, with 30 beds at Dwarigeria, is the major government medical facility in the Garhbeta III CD block. There are primary health centres at : Chottotara (PO Guiadaha) (with 10 beds) and Nayabasat (with 4 beds).

References

Community development blocks in Paschim Medinipur district